Giovanni Crivelli (active 1730–1750, died 1760, Parma) was an Italian painter of the late-Baroque, who specialized in animal scenes, often game in a landscape. Little is known of his life; he was the son and trainee of the painter Angelo Maria Crivelli.

Sources

CREDEM collection in Reggio Emilia

18th-century births
18th-century deaths
18th-century Italian painters
Italian male painters
Italian Baroque painters
Italian painters of animals
Painters from Parma
18th-century Italian male artists